Abu ul-Ala Shirazi (died 1001) lived around the 10th century at the court of the Buyid emir 'Adud al-Dawla. He found that arsenic could cure malaria.

References

10th-century births
Year of birth unknown
1001 deaths
Malariologists
10th-century Iranian physicians
People under the Buyid dynasty